John Jones (18 September 1858 – 18 September 1937) was an English first-class cricketer.

Background
Jones was born at Birmingham. He died on his 79th birthday at Kingsfield Cottage, Chalfont St Giles, Buckinghamshire, although according to the Herts and Essex Observer, he died on 6 March 1937, aged 81 years.

Cricket career
Jones made his debut in first-class cricket for the South in the North v South fixture at Lord's in 1884. He played again for the South in the 1885 fixture. In that same season he played a first-class match for the Players of the South against the Gentlemen of the South at The Oval, scoring a century in the Players first-innings when he made 125, in a 212-run partnership with William Tester, who made 108. 

Jones later played minor counties cricket for Hertfordshire, appearing once in the 1896 Minor Counties Championship against Norfolk. Between 1889 and 1907 he played for Bishop's Stortford Cricket Club.

References

External links

1858 births
1937 deaths
Cricketers from Birmingham, West Midlands
English cricketers
North v South cricketers
Players of the South cricketers
Hertfordshire cricketers
English cricketers of 1864 to 1889
English cricketers of 1890 to 1918